The 1995 Sultan Azlan Shah Cup was the sixth edition of field hockey tournament the Sultan Azlan Shah Cup.

Participating nations
Six countries participated in the tournament:

Final ranking
This ranking does not reflect the actual performance of the team as the ranking issued by the International Hockey Federation. This is just a benchmark ranking in the Sultan Azlan Shah Cup only.

References

External links
Official website

1995 in field hockey
1995
1995 in Malaysian sport
1995 in New Zealand sport
1995 in Canadian sports
1995 in German sport
1995 in Spanish sport
1995 in Indian sport